Eczemotes undata is a species of beetle in the family Cerambycidae. It was described by Xavier Montrouzier in 1855. It is known from Papua New Guinea, Australia, and Moluccas.

Subspecies
 Eczemotes undata keyana Breuning, 1961
 Eczemotes undata undata (Montrouzier, 1855)

References

Pteropliini
Beetles described in 1855